Linval Dixon (born 14 September 1971) is a Jamaican football coach and former player. A former defender, he played for American club Charleston Battery and Hazard United at club level. At international level, he made 127 appearances for the Jamaica national team. He has worked as head coach at Portmore United.

Club career
Dixon was born in Old Harbour Bay, Saint Catherine, Jamaica. He attended Clarendon College where he played on the school's team.  In 1995, he signed with the Charleston Battery of the USISL.  He moved to Hazard United in the fall of 1995 and played for them until 2002 when he returned to the Battery for two seasons in the USL A-League.  In 2003, Dixon and his teammates won the A-League championship.

International career
Dixon has captained Jamaica and was a participant at the 1998 FIFA World Cup. He made his debut in 1991 and played his last international in 2004 against Venezuela, collecting over 90 caps, including 27 FIFA World Cup qualifying matches.

Managerial career
In 2005, Dixon became the manager of Portmore United U23 team.

In 2007, he became the head coach of the club's senior team, with whom he won the 2007–08 National Premier League. At the end of the 2009 season, he stepped down to become an assistant manager. He returned to his position as head manager for the 2010 season.

Honours

As manager
Portmore United
 National Premier League: 2007–08

See also
 List of men's footballers with 100 or more international caps

References

External links
 Charleston Battery: Linval Dixon
 FIFA: Linval Dixon

1971 births
Living people
Jamaican footballers
Jamaican expatriate footballers
1991 CONCACAF Gold Cup players
1993 CONCACAF Gold Cup players
1998 CONCACAF Gold Cup players
1998 FIFA World Cup players
Jamaica international footballers
A-League (1995–2004) players
Charleston Battery players
Portmore United F.C. players
USL Second Division players
Jamaican expatriate sportspeople in the United States
Expatriate soccer players in the United States
Association football defenders
FIFA Century Club
National Premier League players
People from Saint Catherine Parish